Tortoises are reptiles of the family Testudinidae of the order Testudines (Latin: tortoise). Like other turtles, tortoises have a shell to protect from predation and other threats. The shell in tortoises is generally hard, and like other members of the suborder Cryptodira, they retract their necks and heads directly backward into the shell to protect them.

Several lineages of tortoises have independently evolved very large body sizes in excess of 100 kg, including the Galapagos giant tortoise and the Aldabra giant tortoise. They are usually diurnal animals with tendencies to be crepuscular depending on the ambient temperatures. They are generally reclusive animals. Tortoises are the longest-living land animals in the world, although the longest-living species of tortoise is a matter of debate. Galápagos tortoises are noted to live over 150 years, but an Aldabra giant tortoise named Adwaita may have lived an estimated 255 years. In general, most tortoise species can live 80–150 years.

Tortoises are placid and slow-moving, with an average walking speed of 0.2–0.5 km/h.

Terminology
Differences exist in usage of the common terms turtle, tortoise, and terrapin, depending on the variety of English being used; usage is inconsistent and contradictory. These terms are common names and do not reflect precise biological or taxonomic distinctions.

The American Society of Ichthyologists and Herpetologists uses "turtle" to describe all species of the order Testudines, regardless of whether they are land-dwelling or sea-dwelling, and uses "tortoise" as a more specific term for slow-moving terrestrial species. General American usage agrees; turtle is often a general term (although some restrict it to aquatic turtles); tortoise is used only in reference to terrestrial turtles or, more narrowly, only those members of Testudinidae, the family of modern land tortoises; and terrapin may refer to turtles that are small and live in fresh and brackish water, in particular the diamondback terrapin (Malaclemys terrapin). In America, for example, the members of the genus Terrapene dwell on land, yet are referred to as box turtles rather than tortoises.

British usage, by contrast, tends not to use "turtle" as a generic term for all members of the order, and also applies the term "tortoises" broadly to all land-dwelling members of the order Testudines, regardless of whether they are actually members of the family Testudinidae. In Britain, terrapin is used to refer to a larger group of semiaquatic turtles than the restricted meaning in America.

Australian usage is different from both American and British usage. Land tortoises are not native to Australia, and traditionally freshwater turtles have been called "tortoises" in Australia. Some Australian experts disapprove of this usage—believing that the term tortoises is "better confined to purely terrestrial animals with very different habits and needs, none of which are found in this country"—and promote the use of the term "freshwater turtle" to describe Australia's primarily aquatic members of the order Testudines because it avoids misleading use of the word "tortoise" and also is a useful distinction from marine turtles.

Biology

Life cycle

Most species of tortoises lay small clutch sizes, seldom exceeding 20 eggs, and many species have clutch sizes of only 1–2 eggs. Incubation is characteristically long in most species, the average incubation period are between 100 and 160.0 days. Egg-laying typically occurs at night, after which the mother tortoise covers her clutch with sand, soil, and organic material. The eggs are left unattended, and depending on the species, take from 60 to 120 days to incubate. The size of the egg depends on the size of the mother and can be estimated by examining the width of the cloacal opening between the carapace and plastron. The plastron of a female tortoise often has a noticeable V-shaped notch below the tail which facilitates passing the eggs. Upon completion of the incubation period, a fully formed hatchling uses an egg tooth to break out of its shell. It digs to the surface of the nest and begins a life of survival on its own. They are hatched with an embryonic egg sac which serves as a source of nutrition for the first three to seven days until they have the strength and mobility to find food. Juvenile tortoises often require a different balance of nutrients than adults, so may eat foods which a more mature tortoise would not. For example, the young of a strictly herbivorous species commonly will consume worms or insect larvae for additional protein.

The number of concentric rings on the carapace, much like the cross-section of a tree, can sometimes give a clue to how old the animal is, but, since the growth depends highly on the accessibility of food and water, a tortoise that has access to plenty of forage (or is regularly fed by its owner) with no seasonal variation will have no noticeable rings. Moreover, some tortoises grow more than one ring per season, and in some others, due to wear, some rings are no longer visible.

Tortoises generally have one of the longest lifespans of any animal, and some individuals are known to have lived longer than 150 years. Because of this, they symbolize longevity in some cultures, such as Chinese culture. The oldest tortoise ever recorded, and one of the oldest individual animals ever recorded, was Tu'i Malila, which was presented to the Tongan royal family by the British explorer James Cook shortly after its birth in 1777. Tu'i Malila remained in the care of the Tongan royal family until its death by natural causes on May 19, 1965, at the age of 188.

The Alipore Zoo in India was the home to Adwaita, which zoo officials claimed was the oldest living animal until its death on March 23, 2006. Adwaita (also spelled Addwaita) was an Aldabra giant tortoise brought to India by Lord Wellesley, who handed it over to the Alipur Zoological Gardens in 1875 when the zoo was set up. West Bengal officials said records showed Adwaita was at least 150 years old, but other evidence pointed to 250. Adwaita was said to be the pet of Robert Clive.

Harriet was a resident at the Australia Zoo in Queensland from 1987 to her death in 2006; she was believed to have been brought to England by Charles Darwin aboard the Beagle and then on to Australia by John Clements Wickham. Harriet died on June 23, 2006, just shy of her 176th birthday.

Timothy, a female spur-thighed tortoise, lived to be about 165 years old. For 38 years, she was carried as a mascot aboard various ships in Britain's Royal Navy. Then in 1892, at age 53, she retired to the grounds of Powderham Castle in Devon. Up to the time of her death in 2004, she was believed to be the United Kingdom's oldest resident.

Jonathan, a Seychelles giant tortoise living on the island of St Helena, may be as old as  years.

Sexual dimorphism
Many species of tortoises are sexually dimorphic, though the differences between males and females vary from species to species. In some species, males have a longer, more protruding neck plate than their female counterparts, while in others, the claws are longer on the females.

The male plastron is curved inwards to aid reproduction. The easiest way to determine the sex of a tortoise is to look at the tail. The females, as a general rule, have smaller tails, dropped down, whereas the males have much longer tails which are usually pulled up and to the side of the rear shell.

Brain
The brain of a tortoise is extremely small. Red-footed tortoises, from Central and South America, do not have an area in the brain called the hippocampus, which relates to emotion, learning, memory and spatial navigation. Studies have shown that red-footed tortoises may rely on an area of the brain called the medial cortex for emotional actions, an area that humans use for actions such as decision making.

In the 17th century, Francesco Redi performed an experiment that involved removing the brain of a land tortoise, which then proceeded to live six months. Freshwater tortoises, when subjected to the same experiment, continued similarly, but did not live so long. Redi also cut the head off a tortoise entirely, and it lived for 23 days.

Distribution
Tortoises are found from southern North America to southern South America, around the Mediterranean basin, across Eurasia to Southeast Asia, in sub-Saharan Africa, Madagascar, and some Pacific islands. They are absent from Australasia. They live in diverse habitats, including deserts, arid grasslands, and scrub to wet evergreen forests, and from sea level to mountains. Most species, however, occupy semiarid habitats.

Many large islands are or were characterized by species of giant tortoises. Part of the reason for this is that tortoises are good at oceanic dispersal. Despite being unable to swim, tortoises are able to survive long periods adrift at sea because they can survive months without food or fresh water. Tortoises have been known to survive oceanic dispersals of more than 740 km. Once on islands tortoises faced few predators or competitors and could grow to large sizes and become the dominant large herbivores on many islands due to their low metabolic rate and reduced need for fresh water compared to mammals.

Today there are only two living species of giant tortoises, the Aldabra giant tortoise on Aldabra Atoll and the several species/subspecies of Galapagos giant tortoise found on the Galapagos Islands. However, until recently giant tortoises could be found on nearly every major island group, including the Bahamas, the Greater Antilles (including Cuba and Hispaniola), the Lesser Antilles, the Canary Islands, Malta, the Seychelles, the Mascarene Islands (including Mauritius and Reunion), and Madagascar. Most of these tortoises were wiped out by human arrival. Many of these giant tortoises are not closely related (belonging to different genera such as Megalochelys, Chelonoidis, Centrochelys, Aldabrachelys, Cylindraspis, and Hesperotestudo), but are thought to have independently evolved large body size through convergent evolution. Giant tortoises are notably absent from Australasia and many south Pacific islands, but the distantly related meiolaniid turtles are thought to have filled the same niche. Giant tortoises are also known from the Oligocene-Pliocene of mainland North America, South America, Europe, Asia, and Africa, but are all now extinct, which is also attributed to human activity.

Diet

Tortoises are generally considered to be strict herbivores, feeding on grasses, weeds, leafy greens, flowers, and some fruits. However, hunting and eating of birds has been observed on occasion. Pet tortoises typically require diets based on wild grasses, weeds, leafy greens and certain flowers. Certain species consume worms or insects and carrion in their normal habitats. Too much protein is detrimental in herbivorous species, and has been associated with shell deformities and other medical problems. Different tortoise species vary greatly in their nutritional requirements.

Behavior 
Communication in tortoises is different from many other reptiles. Because they are restricted by their shell and short limbs, visual communication is not a strong form of communication in tortoises. Tortoises use olfactory cues to determine the sex of other tortoises so that they can find a potential mate. Tactile communication is important in tortoises during combat and courtship. In both combat and courtship, tortoises use ramming to communicate with other individuals.

Taxonomy

This species list largely follows Turtle Taxonomy Working Group (2021) and the Turtle Extinctions Working Group (2015).

Family Testudinidae Batsch 1788
 Alatochelon
  Alatochelon myrteum
 Aldabrachelys Loveridge and Williams 1957:166
 Aldabrachelys gigantea Aldabran giant tortoise.
 †Aldabrachelys abrupta Late Holocene, extinct circa 1200 AD
 †Aldabrachelys grandidieri Late Holocene, extinct circa 884 AD
 Astrochelys Gray, 1873:4
 Astrochelys radiata, radiated tortoise
 Astrochelys yniphora, angonoka tortoise, (Madagascan) plowshare tortoise
 Centrochelys Gray 1872:5
  Centrochelys atlantica
  Centrochelys burchardi
  Centrochelys marocana
  Centrochelys robusta
 Centrochelys sulcata, African spurred tortoise, sulcata tortoise
  Centrochelys vulcanica
 Chelonoidis Fitzinger 1835:112
  Chelonoidis alburyorum Abaco tortoise, Late Pleistocene, extinct c. 1400 CE
 Chelonoidis carbonarius, red-footed tortoise
 Chelonoidis chilensis, Chaco tortoise, Argentine tortoise or southern wood tortoise
  Chelonoidis cubensis Cuban giant tortoise
 Chelonoidis denticulatus Brazilian giant tortoise, yellow-footed tortoise
 C. dominicensis Dominican giant tortoise
 Chelonoidis lutzae Lutz's giant tortoise, Late Pleistocene
  Chelonoidis monensis Mona tortoise
 Chelonoidis niger Galapagos giant tortoise
  Chelonoidis sellovii Southern Cone giant tortoise, Pleistocene
  Chelonoidis sombrerensis Sombrero giant tortoise, Late Pleistocene
 Chersina Gray 1830:5
 Chersina angulata, angulated tortoise, South African bowsprit tortoise
  Cheirogaster Bergounioux 1935:78
 †Cheirogaster gymnesica Late Pliocene to Early Pleistocene
 †Cheirogaster schafferi Pliocene to Early Pleistocene
 Chersobius Fitzinger, 1835
 Chersobius boulengeri, Karoo padloper, Karoo dwarf tortoise, Boulenger's Cape tortoise
 Chersobius signatus, speckled padloper tortoise
 Chersobius solus, Nama padloper, Berger's Cape tortoise
 †Cylindraspis Fitzinger 1835:112 (all species extinct) following Austin and Arnold, 2001:
 †Cylindraspis indica, synonym Cylindraspis borbonica, Reunion giant tortoise
 †Cylindraspis inepta, saddle-backed Mauritius giant tortoise or Mauritius giant domed tortoise
 †Cylindraspis peltastes, domed Rodrigues giant tortoise
 †Cylindraspis triserrata, domed Mauritius giant tortoise or Mauritius giant flat-shelled tortoise
 †Cylindraspis vosmaeri, saddle-backed Rodrigues giant tortoise
  Ergilemys Ckhikvadze, 1984
 Ergilemys bruneti
 Ergilemys insolitus
 Ergilemys saikanensis
 Geochelone Fitzinger 1835:112
  Geochelone burchardi Tenerife giant tortoise
  Geochelone vulcanica Gran Canaria giant tortoise
 Geochelone elegans, Indian star tortoise
 Geochelone platynota, Burmese star tortoise
  Geochelone robusta Malta giant tortoise
 Gopherus Rafinesque 1832:64
 Gopherus agassizii, Mojave desert tortoise, Agassiz's desert tortoise
 Gopherus berlandieri, Texas tortoise, Berlandier's tortoise
 Gopherus flavomarginatus, Bolson tortoise
 Gopherus morafkai, Sonoran desert tortoise, Morafka's desert tortoise
 Gopherus polyphemus, gopher tortoise
  Hadrianus
 Hadrianus corsoni (syn. H. octonarius)
 Hadrianus robustus
 Hadrianus schucherti
 Hadrianus utahensis
  Hesperotestudo
 Hesperotestudo alleni
 Hesperotestudo angusticeps
 Hesperotestudo brontops
 Hesperotestudo equicomes
 Hesperotestudo impensa
 Hesperotestudo incisa
 Hesperotestudo johnstoni
 Hesperotestudo kalganensis
 Hesperotestudo niobrarensis
 Hesperotestudo orthopygia
 Hesperotestudo osborniana
 Hesperotestudo percrassa
 Hesperotestudo riggsi
 Hesperotestudo tumidus
 Hesperotestudo turgida
 Hesperotestudo wilsoni
 Homopus Duméril and Bibron 1834:357
 Homopus areolatus, common padloper, parrot-beaked tortoise, beaked Cape tortoise
 Homopus femoralis, greater padloper, greater dwarf tortoise
 Indotestudo Lindholm, 1929
 Indotestudo elongata, elongated tortoise, yellow-headed tortoise
 Indotestudo forstenii, Forsten's tortoise, East Indian tortoise
 Indotestudo travancorica, Travancore tortoise
 Kinixys
 Kinixys belliana, Bell's hinge-back tortoise
 Kinixys erosa, forest hinge-back tortoise, serrated hinge-back tortoise
 Kinixys homeana, Home's hinge-back tortoise
 Kinixys lobatsiana, Lobatse hinge-back tortoise
 Kinixys natalensis, Natal hinge-back tortoise
 Kinixys spekii, Speke's hinge-back tortoise
 Malacochersus Lindholm 1929:285
 Malacochersus tornieri, pancake tortoise
 Manouria Gray 1854:133
 Manouria emys, Asian giant tortoise, brown tortoise (mountain tortoise)
 Manouria impressa, impressed tortoise
  Megalochelys Falconer, H. and Cautley, P.T. 1837.
  Megalochelys atlas, Atlas tortoise, Extinct – Pliocene to Pleistocene
  Megalochelys cautleyi, Cautley's giant tortoise
 Psammobates Fitzinger 1835:113
 Psammobates geometricus, geometric tortoise
 Psammobates oculifer, serrated tent tortoise, Kalahari tent tortoise
 Psammobates tentorius, African tent tortoise
 Pyxis Bell 1827:395
 Pyxis arachnoides, (Madagascan) spider tortoise
 Pyxis planicauda, flat-backed spider tortoise, (Madagascan) flat-tailed tortoise, flat-tailed spider tortoise
 Stigmochelys Gray, 1873
 Stigmochelys pardalis, leopard tortoise
  Stylemys
 Stylemys botti
 Stylemys calaverensis
 Stylemys canetotiana
 Stylemys capax
 Stylemys conspecta
 Stylemys copei
 Stylemys emiliae
 Stylemys frizaciana
 Stylemys karakolensis
 Stylemys nebrascensis (syn. S. amphithorax)
 Stylemys neglectus
 Stylemys oregonensis
 Stylemys pygmea
 Stylemys uintensis
 Stylemys undabuna
 Titanochelon
 Titanochelon gymnesica  (Bate, 1914)  Balearic Islands, Pliocene
  Titanochelon bolivari  (Hernandez-Pacheco, 1917)  (type) Iberian Peninsula, Miocene
  Titanochelon bacharidisi  (Vlachos et al., 2014)  Greece, Bulgaria, Late Miocene
  Titanochelon perpiniana  (Deperet 1885)  France, Pliocene
 Titanochelon schafferi  (Szalai, 1931)  Samos, Greece, Miocene
 Titanochelon vitodurana (Biedermann 1862)  Switzerland, Early Miocene
 Titanochelon kayadibiensis  Karl, Staesche & Safi, 2021, Anatolia, Miocene
 Titanochelon eurysternum  (Gervais, 1848–1852)  France, Miocene
 Titanochelon ginsburgi  (de Broin, 1977 ) France, Miocene
 Titanochelon leberonensis (Depéret, 1890)  France, Miocene
 Testudo
 Testudo graeca, Greek tortoise, spur-thighed tortoise, Moorish tortoise
 Testudo hermanni, Hermann's tortoise
 Testudo horsfieldii, Russian tortoise
 Testudo kleinmanni, Egyptian tortoise, including Negev tortoise
 Testudo marginata, marginated tortoise

Phylogeny
A molecular phylogeny of tortoises, following Le et al. (2006: 525):

A separate phylogeny via mtDNA analysis was found by Kehlmaier et al. (2021):

In 2023 Kehlmaier again recovered a very similar phylogeny to the 2021 one, which further reaffirmed the evolutionary distinctiveness of the extinct Cylindraspis, but swapped the position of Gopherus and Manouria, making Gopherus the most basal genus.

In human culture

In religion

In Hinduism, Kurma was the second Avatar of Vishnu. Like the Matsya Avatara, Kurma also belongs to the Satya Yuga. Vishnu took the form of a half-man, half-tortoise, the lower half being a tortoise. He is normally shown as having four arms. He sat on the bottom of the ocean after the Great Flood. A mountain was placed on his back by the other gods so they could churn the sea and find the ancient treasures of the Vedic peoples.

In Judaism and early Christianity tortoises were seen as unclean animals.

Tortoise shells were used by ancient Chinese as oracle bones to make predictions.

The tortoise is a symbol of the Ancient Greek god, Hermes.

In space
In September, 1968, two Russian tortoises became the first animals to fly to and circle the Moon. Their Zond 5 mission brought them back to Earth safely.

As pets

As food

In fiction
Teenage Mutant Ninja Turtles is an entertainment franchise. The four anthropomorphic turtle brothers trained in ninjitsu are shown to fight evil in New York City.

Gallery

See also
 Cultural depictions of turtles
 Jackson ratio

References

Further reading

External links

 Family Testudinidae (Tortoises), The Reptile Database
 Chelonia: Conservation and care of turtles.
 Live Tortoise Stream : Live Tortoise Stream